Wurdastom is a genus of flowering plants belonging to the family Melastomataceae.

It is native to Colombia, Ecuador and Peru in western South America.

Known species
There are 8 accepted species by Plants of the World Online (as of Jan. 2022):

Taxonomy
The genus name of Wurdastom is in honour of John Julius Wurdack (1921–1998), an American botanist at the New York Botanical Garden and also the Smithsonian Institution. 
It was first described and published in Ann. Naturhist. Mus. Wien, B 98 (Suppl.) on page 461 in 1996.

References

Melastomataceae
Melastomataceae genera
Plants described in 1996
Flora of Colombia
Flora of Ecuador
Flora of Peru